Conradin Kreutzer or Kreuzer (22 November 1780 – 14 December 1849) was a German composer and conductor. His works include the operas Das Nachtlager in Granada and incidental music to Der Verschwender, both produced in 1834 in Vienna.

Biography
Born in Meßkirch, Baden, Kreutzer abandoned his studies in the law (University of Freiburg) and went to Vienna about 1804, where he met Joseph Haydn and may have studied with Johann Georg Albrechtsberger, while he tried his hand unsuccessfully at singspielen. He spent 1811–12 in Stuttgart, where at least three of his operas were staged  and he was awarded the post of Hofkapellmeister. He was from 1812 to 1816 Kapellmeister to the king of Württemberg. Once he was successful, he became a prolific composer, and wrote a number of operas for the Theater am Kärntnertor, Theater in der Josefstadt and Theater an der Wien Vienna, which have disappeared from the stage.

In 1840, he became conductor of the opera at Cologne. His daughters, Cecilia and Marie Kreutzer, were sopranos of some renown.

Kreutzer owes his fame almost exclusively to Das Nachtlager in Granada (1834), which kept the stage for half a century in spite of changes in musical taste. It was written in the style of Carl Maria von Weber. The same qualities are found in Kreutzer's part-songs for men's voices, which at one time were extremely popular in Germany. Among these "Das ist der Tag des Herrn" ("The Lord's Day"). His Septet for wind and strings, Op. 62, remains in the chamber music repertory. He was one of the 50 composers who wrote a variation on a waltz of Anton Diabelli for Part II of the "Vaterländischer Künstlerverein" (published 1824).

He died in Riga.

Selected works
Operas
 Die Alpenhütte, Oper (August von Kotzebue), 1 March 1815, Stuttgart
 Libussa, romantische Oper (Joseph Carl Bernard) 4 December 1822, Vienna, Theater am Kärntnertor
 Melusina, romantische Oper (Franz Grillparzer) 27 February 1833, Berlin, Königstädtisches Theater
 Das Nachtlager in Granada, romantische Oper (Karl Johann Braun von Braunthal) 13 January 1834, Vienna, Theater in der Josefstadt

Chamber works
 Septet in E-flat, Op. 62 for clarinet, horn, bassoon, string trio, double bass (c.1816)
 Clarinet Trio in E-flat major, Op. 43
 Duo in C major
 Fantasia for Bassoon in F major
 Variations in G for the Chromatic Trumpet
 Variations in B-flat major for Bassoon and Piano

Orchestral works
 Piano Concerto No. 1 in B-flat major, Op. 42 (1818)
 Piano Concerto No. 2 in C-minor, Op. 50 (1822)
 Piano Concerto No. 3 in E-flat major, Op. 65

Choral works
 Te Deum in D major, KWV 3301
 Abendlied

Vocal works
 Das Mühlrad song for Soprano, Clarinet and Pianoforte 
 Die Lüfte weh'n so lind (text by Elise Schlick)
 Frühlingsglaube

Piano work
 Romanza for piano

References

External links
 
 
 Conradin Kreutzer: Briefe – Gesamtausgabe

1780 births
1849 deaths
19th-century classical composers
19th-century conductors (music)
19th-century German composers
German conductors (music)
German expatriates in Austria
German male classical composers
German male conductors (music)
German opera composers
German Romantic composers
Male opera composers
People from Meßkirch
University of Freiburg alumni